Julien Nantel (born September 6, 1996) is a Canadian former professional ice hockey forward. He was drafted in the 6th round by the Colorado Avalanche in the 2014 NHL Entry Draft.

Playing career
Nantel played 40 games for the Laval-Montreal Rousseau Royal in the QMAAA as a 15 year old, and scored 11 goals with 17 assists and 8 penalty minutes. In his second season with the Royal's he led the team in the playoffs to capture the championship and earn honors as the playoff MVP with 17 points in 17 games.

He was selected by Rouyn-Noranda Huskies in the second round (30th overall) of the 2012 QMJHL Entry Draft. Despite being ranked much higher, he was drafted in the 6th round of the 2014 NHL Entry draft but continued to play in the QMJHL; over the next two seasons he improved both his offensive numbers and his skill as a defensive forward. On March 9, 2016 he signed a three-year, entry-level contract with the Colorado Avalanche.

In his rookie professional season in 2016–17, Nantel was assigned to American Hockey League affiliate, the San Antonio Rampage, on October 1, 2016. Used in primarily a defensive forward role, Nantel appeared in 59 games with the Rampage for 8 points. On March 8, 2017, Nantel was re-assigned to secondary ECHL affiliate, the Colorado Eagles. Provided a larger role with the Eagles to continue his development, Nantel remained with the club through the post-season, flourishing in recording 8 goals and 16 points in 20 games to help the Eagles capture their first Kelly Cup.

As an impending restricted free agent following the conclusion of his entry-level contract, Nantel's tenure with the Avalanche ended after he was not tendered a qualifying offer on June 25, 2019. After exploring free agency, Nantel opted to return and continue with the Colorado Eagles, accepting a one-year AHL contract on July 23, 2019. In the 2019–20 season, Nantel in his fourth AHL campaign registered career best marks of 8 goals, 5 assists and 13 points in 35 games before the season was ended prematurely due to the COVID-19 pandemic.

Sitting out the ensuing 2020–21 season, Nantel returned to the professional ranks in agreeing to a contract with inaugural ECHL club, Trois-Rivières Lions, on July 16, 2021. In the 2021–22 season, Nantel was limited to just 33 regular season games due to an ankle injury and later a concussion, however was able to contribute with 17 points. After appearing in the opening two playoff contests, Nantel was demoted as a healthy scratch and later left the club announcing his retirement from professional hockey to pursue a career in finance.

Career statistics

Regular season and playoffs

International

Awards and honours

References

External links

1996 births
Living people
Canadian ice hockey forwards
Colorado Avalanche draft picks
Colorado Eagles players
Ice hockey people from Quebec
Rouyn-Noranda Huskies players
San Antonio Rampage players
Sportspeople from Laval, Quebec
Trois-Rivières Lions players
Utah Grizzlies (ECHL) players